The Ambai language is an Austronesian language spoken in Indonesian New Guinea (Papua Province), mostly on the Ambai Islands as well as the southern part of Yapen Island. The number of speakers is estimated to be 10,000. Dialects are Randawaya, Ambai (Wadapi-Laut), and Manawi.

Phonology
Ambai has 19 consonants and 6 vowels, shown on the tables below.

Morphology

Pronouns
All pronouns in Ambai mark for number, person and clusivity (in first person).

The following bound pronouns are obligatorily added as affixes to the verb to stand as the subject of the sentence. Every verb in Ambai takes a subject, even if it is a 'dummy' third-person pronoun.

The following pronouns are independent and are more restricted in use. They do not appear as subjects – since the subject is marked already on the verb – but can appear as objects, in prepositional phrases and in subordinate clauses. Some verbs allow the object pronoun to be omitted.

Examples of pronouns used in everyday language:

References

Further reading
 P.J. Silzer Ambai, an Austronesian Language of Irian Jaya, Indonesia, Ph.D. Australian National University, 1983.

External links
 The Ambai Language Documentation Page
 A Short Description of Ambai Grammar, by Ariel Gutman
  A Grammar Sketch of Ambai, by Fannie St-Pierre-Tanguay

South Halmahera–West New Guinea languages
Languages of western New Guinea
Ambai Islands
Cenderawasih Bay
Papua (province) culture